Vassa is a 1983 Soviet drama film directed by Gleb Panfilov. It is based on Maxim Gorky's 1910 play Vassa Zheleznova. Vassa won the Golden Prize at the 13th Moscow International Film Festival. The film was also selected as the Soviet entry for the Best Foreign Language Film at the 56th Academy Awards, but was not accepted as a nominee.

Plot
The film tells the story of a merchant family's decline. Vassa Zheleznova for many years works as head of her family business and in spite of her mischief-making children, dissolute husband, an alcoholic brother and anarchist sister-in-law, tries to maintain a semblance of a normal family. The year 1913 arrives and all of what her life is dedicated to becomes shattered.

Cast
 Inna Churikova as Vassa Zheleznova
 Vadim Medvedev  as Husband
 Nikolai Skorobogatov  as Brother
 Valentina Telichkina  as Servant
 Olga Mashnaya  as Daughter
 Yana Poplavskaya  as Daughter
 Valentina Yakunina as Daughter-in-law
 Vyacheslav Bogachyov  as Son
 Ivan Panfilov  as Grandson (as Vanya Panfilov)
 Albert Filozov as Melnikov

See also
 List of submissions to the 56th Academy Awards for Best Foreign Language Film
 List of Soviet submissions for the Academy Award for Best Foreign Language Film

References

External links
 

1983 films
1983 drama films
1980s Russian-language films
Films directed by Gleb Panfilov
Films based on works by Maxim Gorky
Films set in 1913
Films set in Nizhny Novgorod
Films set in the Russian Empire
Films shot in Nizhny Novgorod
Soviet films based on plays
Soviet drama films